Afzali is a surname. Notable people with the surname include:

Ahmad Wais Afzali (born 1972), American imam
Bahram Afzali (1938–1984), Imperial Iranian Navy commander
Kathy Afzali (born 1957), American politician
Shah Abdul Ahad Afzali, Afghan politician
Sara Afzali, Greek Businessman

See also
Hossein Malek-Afzali (born 1939), Iranian scientist